Grundmann is a surname. Notable people with the surname include:

 Emil Otto Grundmann (1844–1890), German painter who studied in Antwerp under Baron Hendrik Leys, later moving to America
 Erhard Grundmann, German luger from Czechoslovakia
 Erich Grundmann (1906–1973), Knight's Cross of the Iron Cross recipient during World War II
 Oliver Grundmann (born 1971), German politician
 Walter Grundmann (1906–1976), German Protestant theologian during the Third Reich and DDR
 Wolfgang Grundmann (born 1948), member of the Red Army Faction
 Reiner Grundmann (born 1955), German sociologist

See also 
 Grundmann aldehyde synthesis, chemical reaction that produces an aldehyde from an acyl halide
 Grundman (surname page)

German-language surnames
Jewish surnames